Blue Jay 6 is an unincorporated community in Raleigh County, West Virginia, United States. Blue Jay 6 is located between Interstate 77 and U.S. Route 19, southwest of Shady Spring.

References

Unincorporated communities in Raleigh County, West Virginia
Unincorporated communities in West Virginia